Nighthawk is the name of several fictional characters appearing in American comic books published by Marvel Comics. There have been seven versions of the character: two supervillains-turned-superheroes from the mainstream Marvel Universe continuity (Earth-616), Kyle Richmond (who belonged to the Squadron Sinister) and Tilda Johnson (the former Deadly Nightshade); two S.H.I.E.L.D. agents, Joaquin Pennyworth and Jackson F. "Jack" Norriss; and five from alternate universes, who belonged to various incarnations of the Squadron Supreme, including the Kyle and Neal Richmond of Earth-712, and an African-American version of Kyle Richmond from Earth-31916 who primarily kills white supremacists and mentors Tilda upon travelling to Earth-616; after his death, a simulacrum of him is created by Mephisto and programmed by the Power Elite to serve as a member of the Squadron Supreme of America, under the command of Phil Coulson.

Nighthawk has made limited appearances in animation and live-action, with Adam West and Anthony Ruivivar respectively voicing him in 2010 and 2016 episodes of The Super Hero Squad Show and Avengers Assemble; while in the Marvel Cinematic Universe (MCU), Scoot McNairy portrays impersonator Jackson Norriss in the live-action short film All Hail the King (2014), with A. J. Bowen portraying the real Jackson Norris in the web series WHIH Newsfront (2016), Gabrielle Dennis portraying Tilda Johnson in the 2018 second season of the Netflix television series Luke Cage, and Nabiyah Be portraying Linda Johnson (a character also based on Tilda Johnson) in the film Black Panther (also 2018).

Publication history
Kyle Richmond, the original Nighthawk, debuted as a supervillain in the final panel of The Avengers #69 (October 1969). This story is the first chapter of a three-issue story arc by writer Roy Thomas and penciller Sal Buscema. The arc introduced the supervillain team the Squadron Sinister, whose four members were loosely based on heroes in DC Comics' Justice League of America, with Nighthawk based on Batman.

Following this arc, Nighthawk pursues a solo career, next appearing in Daredevil #62 (March 1970). Here, Richmond attempts through underhanded means to tarnish DD's reputation and supplant him. Daredevil tricks Richmond into revealing his criminal activities to the public and, after a battle atop a subway, Nighthawk makes good his escape.

Nighthawk next appears in the superhero team title The Defenders #13–14 (May–July 1974), he goes to the titular supergroup for help against his former teammates, and joins the team the following issue. Defenders writer Len Wein said that adding Nighthawk to the group "gave me a character to play with who didn't have a whole lot of previous history ... [a] character I could do anything I wanted to without worrying about how it would affect any other titles that character might appear in."

Nighthawk appeared on a regular basis in The Defenders and a number of other Marvel titles. A long-range story arc in The Defenders, beginning in 1979, has Nighthawk under criminal investigation. Writer Ed Hannigan later revealed he planned to end this story arc with Nighthawk being put in prison "for good", but his run on the series ended before he could bring this to fruition.

Defenders writer David Anthony Kraft said, describing Nighthawk's role in the team, "Nighthawk so desperately wanted to be the leader. He would be telling everyone what to do, but no one would listen to him! He may be wealthy and can buy all these toys, but he still gets no respect!"

Nighthawk apparently sacrifices his life in The Defenders #106 (cover dated April 1982). The supervillain Dead Ringer impersonates him in Captain America #429 (July 1994). In the three-issue miniseries Nighthawk (September–November 1998) Richmond is revealed to be alive, but in a coma and brain dead. Through supernatural means, he is revived and resumes his crime-fighting career. He co-starred in the 12-issue run of The Defenders vol. 2 (March 2001– February 2002) and the miniseries The Order #1-6 (April–September 2002). Nighthawk formed a short-lived version of the Defenders, with the mutant Colossus, the Blazing Skull, and She-Hulk, as part of the Initiative, depicted in the miniseries The Last Defenders #1–6 (May–October 2008).

Fictional character biography

Kyle Richmond (Earth-616)
Kyle Richmond was born to two wealthy parents and was brought up by his governess while his dad is away. When Kyle's mother died in an accident, his father sent him to boarding school. Due to his family's money, Kyle got into Grayburn College where he became involved with Mindy Williams who helped him focus through his education. One night, Kyle was caught in a drunk-driving accident in which Mindy was killed, and he was kicked out of school and was unable to return. Kyle later became anti-social, and learned that Grayburn College was closed down due to a lack of funds. Kyle Richmond attempted to join the army, but was rejected due to a heart murmur. Afterwards, Kyle received word that his father died in a plane crash and that Kyle has inherited Richmond Enterprises. Kyle turned to finding a cure for his heart murmur and physically training himself.

While drunk, Kyle Richmond concocted an alchemy serum that he found in an alchemy volume. The alchemy serum enabled Kyle to gain enhanced strength at night. Kyle took on various sports activities to strengthen his natural abilities where he eventually became Nighthawk. Nighthawk and three other supervillains are brought together as the Squadron Sinister by the cosmic entity the Grandmaster to battle the superhero team the Avengers, which has been forced to act as the champions of the time-traveling conqueror Kang the Conqueror. Nighthawk battles the Avenger Captain America, who outfights the villain. The Avengers eventually defeat the Squadron.

Reunited by the alien Nebulon, the villains receive greater power in exchange for the planet Earth, and create a giant laser cannon in the Arctic with a plan to melt the polar ice caps and flood the entirety of the Earth's surface. Despite being asked to join the venture, Nighthawk asks for the aid of superhero team the Defenders, who prevent the scheme and defeat the villains and Nebulon.

The character suffers several setbacks as a superhero, including being charged with tax evasion and fraud by the United States government, and arrested by the FBI for operating as a hero while charges were pending. This stipulation was waived after he was forced to reveal his secret identity. Nighthawk's cumulative wounds from battle eventually leave him paralyzed. Recovering to the point that he can move at night, Nighthawk continues to aid the Defenders, until resigning from the team. He is advised he is to be cleared of all charges if a predetermined amount is repaid to the government.

After apparently sacrificing his life to stop an organization bent on attacking the Soviet Union, Richmond turns up alive but comatose. He has a vision of an angel that facilitates his healing and bestows on him a "second sight", which enables him to see criminal acts before they are committed. In return, he must punish the would-be criminals. Once healed, Richmond becomes Nighthawk once again and fights crime until forced into a confrontation with Daredevil, whom he kills. The "angel" then reveals itself to be the demon Mephisto, who transports Nighthawk and Daredevil's corpse to Hell, intending to claim Daredevil's soul. Nighthawk battles the demons of Hell and manages to revive Daredevil, and together they escape. A sorcerer later purges him of Mephisto's gift.

After an adventure with Fantastic Four member the Thing Nighthawk discovers his abilities are increasing, and learns that his former Squadron Sinister teammate Speed Demon has joined the superhero team the New Thunderbolts. After encountering teammate Hyperion, apparently resurrected after being thought dead, and a new Doctor Spectrum (Alice Nugent), Nighthawk briefly joins the New Thunderbolts, but upon discovering he is being used for his fortune, leaves and rejoins the Squadron Sinister. That team learns that the Grandmaster, using an interdimensional source of superhuman abilities, the Wellspring of Power, has been increasing the team-members' powers. After a battle between the Squadron and the New Thunderbolts, Nighthawk and the other members of the Squadron Sinister scatter and escape.

Nighthawk is initially opposed to the Superhuman Registration Act during the Civil War storyline. Following the death of superhero Black Goliath at the hands of the cyborg clone of Thor on the Pro-Registration Side, Nighthawk joins the Pro-Registration Side, but is defeated in a skirmish with Anti-Registration heroes Falcon and Storm.

Joaquin Pennyworth
After Richmond joins the US government's Fifty State Initiative of registered heroes as Nighthawk, he forms a short-lived Initiative version of the Defenders with the mutant Colossus, the Blazing Skull, and She-Hulk. With She-Hulk and Warlord Krang, battling the group the Sons of the Serpent and culminating in a confrontation with his old Defenders foe Yandroth, Yandroth manipulates time and forces Nighthawk to battle a twisted version of his old team the Squadron Sinister before being rescued by a future incarnation of the Defenders. Noting that one of the future members is Joaquin Pennyworth, an agent of S.H.I.E.L.D. and the son of the one-time leader of the Sons of the Serpent, Richmond asks him to commence training to become the new Nighthawk, before retiring himself.

During the "Fear Itself" storyline, Nighthawk joins Howard the Duck, She-Hulk and Frankenstein's Monster to form the Fearsome Four when Man-Thing is driven on a rampage. They later discover a plot by Psycho-Man to use Man-Thing's volatile empathy to create a weapon.

Jackson F. "Jack" Norriss
Jackson F. "Jack" Norriss and his wife, Barbara worked with the original Nighthawk and the Defenders.  He later became a S.H.I.E.L.D. file-clerk, and then agent often going by the codename Nighthawk. He then went on to be a TV reporter for Inside America. He helped psychiatrist Andrea Sterman uncover a conspiracy involving Roxxon Oil, the CSA, S.H.I.E.L.D., Nomad, and the Thunderbolts.

Kyle Richmond (Earth-31916)
The mature-audience Marvel MAX imprint showcases the adventures of the Earth-31916 version of the Squadron Supreme. This version of Kyle Richmond, an African-American, first appears in the limited series Supreme Power, and utilizes his wealth to train and develop advanced weaponry and devices to aid in his campaign on crime as a vigilante. Although the character aids the loose formation of heroes that eventually become the Squadron Supreme, Nighthawk chooses to remain aloof and only interacts with them when necessary. The character also appears in the six-issue miniseries Supreme Power: Nighthawk, in which he investigates an epidemic of drug addiction in Chicago, and learns it is the work of serial killer Whiteface. Nighthawk apprehends and executes the criminal, but not before he causes the deaths of the Mayor and his family.

After the 2015 "Secret Wars" storyline, Richmond was transported to the regular Marvel Universe. In 2016 Marvel published a comic featuring the character titled Nighthawk, which ran for six issues. The character worked on reforming Chicago and targeted racism and police brutality with the aid of ex-supervillain Tilda Johnson / Deadly Nightshade. The character also joins the local reality's Squadron Supreme, assassinating (and resurrecting) Namor.

Nighthawk and Deadly Nightshade later encounter Hawkeye and Red Wolf. He is machine-gunned to death shortly afterwards, and succeeded as Nighthawk by Deadly Nightshade.

Squadron Supreme of America version
A new version of Kyle Richmond is a member of the Squadron Supreme of America. He is revealed to be a simulacrum created by Mephisto and programmed by the Power Elite to obey Phil Coulson. Nighthawk was programmed to be in top physical condition while sporting some doubt and jealousy for his teammates enough for him to brood. In his personal time, he is a U.S. congressman elected to the House of Representatives to represent Washington DC.

In the team's first mission, Nighthawk and the Squadron Supreme of America fought Namor and the Defenders of the Deep, when they targeted a Roxxon oil platform off the coast of Alaska.

Then, the Squadron Supreme visited another oil platform in the Gulf of Mexico. The Squadron Supreme then made short work of Namor and the Defenders of the Deep.

During the War of the Realms storyline, Kyle was at a congressional hearing when a code red was issued that sent the representatives to the tunnels below. He and the other members of the Squadron Supreme of America were summoned to Washington D.C., where Coulson brought them up to speed with Malekith the Accursed's invasion. Nighthawk and the Squadron Supreme of America fight an army of Rock Trolls and Frost Giants. After the Squadron Supreme caused the Frost Giants to retreat, Coulson sends them to Ohio, which has become a battleground.

Nighthawk was with the Squadron Supreme when they attempted to apprehend Black Panther, when he infiltrated the Pentagon to confront Coulson.

During the Heroes Reborn storyline where reality is altered to feature a world without the Avengers, Nighthawk was with the Squadron Supreme of America when they fought the Masters of Doom. Nighthawk engaged his enemy Black Skull (a version of Red Skull possessed by the Venom symbiote). Following the fight, Blade (whose memories remained intact) confronted Nighthawk to learn more about this reality. He was unable to get any answers. Nighthawk is later called in by police commissioner Luke Cage to deal with a breakout at Ravencroft. Nighthawk defeats most of them easily, but experiences trouble with the Black Skull (whose symbiote wants to return to Nighthawk) and Deadpool (who intends to kill him despite being ordered not to by the breakout's mastermind the Goblin). After defeating the Black Skull and Deadpool, Nighthawk confronts the Goblin, who exposes the former's partner Dr. Gwen Stacy/Nightbird to Goblin Gas in order to make her kill Nighthawk. While Nighthawk cures Stacy and spares the Goblin, the villain commits suicide while revealing to Nighthawk how the world has changed. Following this, Nighthawk returns to his headquarters to review Ravencroft's surveillance footage and discovers Blade and Captain America helped Lopez escape. Later, Black Panther assumes the Ronin alias and breaks into the Squadron's headquarters to steal their files. After fighting Nighthawk, he escapes and joins Blade's group. Nighthawk was with the Squadron Supreme of America when they discuss their encounters with various heroes and concerns about their world being wrong. Putting aside their differences and without telling President Coulson, they gather clues and rule out suspects before eventually arriving in Wakanda where they confront the Avengers. Nighthawk and the rest of the Squadron Supreme are defeated by the Avengers after a fight with them. When reality is returned to normal, Nighthawk and the Squadron Supreme of America find their memories transferred to their counterparts in the Avengers' reality and struggle to find their place in an unfamiliar world.

During the Infinite Destinies storyline, Nighthawk stalks Nick Fury Jr. and wants him to bring his world back. He proceeds to capture Star in order to pull it off. Nick Fury Jr. defeats Nighthawk who manages to escape.

As Nighthawk is being driven around by his Life Model Decoy servants while noting that his entire life is a lie, his car is then intercepted by Black Panther who has noted his nocturnal crime-fighting and outdriving the Sun. Black Panther is told by Nightwing that he resigned as the ambassador to Wakanda because "Kyle Richmond never existed" and states that he was just a "straw man" that the devil created while Nighthawk was real. Black Panther notes that they have a mutual dislike of Mephisto for his role in the alternate reality. As Black Panther needs every ally he can kind with Mephisto going Multiversal, Nighthawk takes up Black Panther's offer as Black Panther resigns as Chairman of the Avengers for an undisclosed leave of absence. Later in New York City, Nighthawk crashes the worshiping of the Serpent Society at their old Serpent Solutions headquarters. The rest of the Avengers arrive to find Nighthawk had defeated the Serpent Society. The portal that the Serpent Society summoned opens as Mephisto's dog form. Nighthawk mentioned that the serpent was one of Mephisto's forms as he plans to put Mephisto down. After Mephisto makes the Council of Red known to them, the Avengers hold a vote and allow Nighthawk to join the Avengers. He states that they will need a time machine for where they can trigger a confrontation with the Council of Red. He then proceeds to join the Avengers in confronting the Serpent Society after they escaped from police custody and are killing people while making their way across the Brooklyn Bridge.

Tilda Johnson

After meeting the Nighthawk of Earth-31916 and helping him defend Chicago from a group of white nationalists called the True Patriots, and the Revelator, Tilda Johnson decides to reform her image as the supervillain Nightshade and train under Nighthawk. Sometime later, they help Hawkeye and Red Wolf after they find barrels of epidurium, a synthetic skin used to build Life-Model Decoys, on a truck that was hijacked. They go to an abandoned coal factory where they end up being attacked by armed soldiers led by Nick Fury. It's later revealed, that Nick Fury, as well as Dum Dum Dugan, Gabe Jones and the other agents, are Life-Model Decoys due to their outdated knowledge and technology. They later thwart an attack by gunmen attempting to rob the base. After defeating the gunmen, Tilda decides to join Hawkeye and Red Wolf on the Avengers, saying her goodbyes to Nighthawk.

During the Secret Empire storyline, while Hawkeye joins the Underground resistance following Hydra's takeover in the United States, the rest of the team gather their own resistance army to help the people in rural areas that are being affected by Hydra's cruel treatment. Tilda is revealed to have become the new Nighthawk, after the former was killed by Hydra soldiers. After several successful victories, the resistance heads to a secret base in South Dakota and prepares for their next attack until Hydra forces raid the base. During the battle, Red Wolf and Tilda have a private conversation, in which both confess their feelings for each other, and they share a kiss. They then head out to help the resistance defeat Hydra.

Powers and abilities
Nighthawk is a superb athlete who, courtesy of an alchemical potion, possesses enhanced strength and increased agility and durability from dusk till dawn. He has also used several costume aids, such as a jet-powered artificial wing system, artificial claw tips, lasers and projectile weapons.

Other versions

Kyle Richmond (Earth-712)
Roy Thomas and penciller John Buscema created an alternate-universe team of heroes called the Squadron Supreme, who debut in The Avengers #85 (February 1971). After an initial skirmish with four Avengers, the teams unite to stop a common threat. The characters (including Nighthawk) were identical in name and appearance to the Squadron Sinister, which caused confusion in Marvel's production department, as the covers of The Avengers #85 and #141 (November 1975) "cover-blurbed" appearances by the Squadron Sinister, when in fact it was the Squadron Supreme that appeared in both issues.

The heroic Nighthawk and the Squadron Supreme have another series of skirmishes with the Avengers engineered by the group the Serpent Cartel, but eventually team together and prevent the use of the artifact the Serpent Crown. The character and his teammates briefly feature in the title Thor, when the evil version of Hyperion attacks the Earth-712 version and then the Thunder God Thor.

Richmond later retires as Nighthawk, feeling that he can better serve the public good as a politician, eventually becoming President of the United States.  However, President Richmond is mentally assaulted by the alien entity known as the Over-Mind, who nearly obliterates the real Richmond's mind and then embarks on a campaign of world domination via an artificial duplicate of the President. The real Richmond is rescued by a psychic entity from Earth-616 with ties to that world's Kyle Richmond, and reconstructs his mind to make him temporarily believe that he is the Nighthawk of Earth-616 (then presumed deceased by his teammates in the Defenders). When the other Squadron members, save for Hyperion, are mind-controlled by the Overmind (who itself is later revealed to be a pawn of another alien menace, Null the Living Darkness), Hyperion and Nighthawk recruit the Defenders to help free the Squadron and defeat the alien threat. When the Richmond working with the Overmind is revealed to be artificial, Nighthawk recalls his true identity and rejoins the Squadron Supreme.

The Squadron's Earth lies in shambles after the Overmind's attempt to conquer the world. Led by Hyperion, the Squadron believe they have the knowledge and power to recreate the world and create a utopia. Nighthawk resigns in protest, believing that the Squadron should serve and not rule; he also ponders assassinating Hyperion to try to halt the Squadron's plans before they begin. At a joint press conference, Richmond resigns as President of the United States and the Squadron announces its plans to the public; Richmond comes prepared to kill Hyperion, but cannot bring himself to do so. The Squadron assumes control of the United States and remakes the nation into a virtual utopia. The team implements a series of sweeping changes, including revealing their secret identities; instituting a program of behavior modification in prisons; enforcing a strict gun control policy, and developing medical technology to resurrect the dead.

Predicting a nightmarish outcome to the Squadron's so-called "Utopia Program", Nighthawk attempts in vain to solicit the aid of the Avengers, and then recruits former Squadron foes and newly emerged superhumans to form a team called the Redeemers. They eventually confront the Squadron, and a brutal battle ensues in which several members of both teams are killed, including Nighthawk. A horrified Hyperion realizes Nighthawk was in fact right and ends the battle, and the Squadron disband and release control of the United States to the government.

The Earth-712 Nighthawk lacks superhuman powers but possesses extensive training and uses a variety of advanced weaponry.

Neal Richmond (Earth-712)
When the remnants of the Squadron Supreme returns to their home universe in the one-shot Squadron Supreme: New World Order, they encounter a new Nighthawk, adopted son of Kyle Richmond and biological son of Kyle's foe the Huckster. The Squadron's reality is now dominated by corporations using the Squadron's own Utopia technologies, with the characters eventually reinstating democracy. For years prior to the Squadron Supreme's return, Neal had organized and supervised a resistance force dubbed the "Nighthawks" who battle the Blue Eagles enlisted by the corporate New World Order. Nighthawk later joins the Squadron.

Nighthawk and the Squadron come into conflict with a new government when interdimensional team the Exiles reveal that the government rigged the election with worldwide vote fraud. The Squadron and the Exiles depose the new government, and attempt to allow society to progress without superhuman involvement.

This character lacks powers but possesses extensive training and uses a variety of advanced weaponry.

Earth X
In the Earth X series and its spin-offs, created by Alex Ross, John Paul Leon, and Jim Krueger, Kyle Richmond is an elderly retired superhero. Kyle Richmond's eyes, given by a disguised Mephisto, allow him to see into the future. He dictates what he sees to his colleague, Isaac Christians, so that a record can be kept of what will become of history. The Earth-9997 version lacks powers but possess extensive training and use a variety of advanced weaponry.

Ultimate Marvel (Earth-1610)
The Ultimate Marvel alternate universe title The Ultimates features a non-powered version of Nighthawk who is the leader of a version of the Defenders. Nighthawk's only attempt at heroics involves leaping from the shadows at a group of petty criminals – only to break his ankle and be severely beaten. In Ultimate Comics: New Ultimates, he and the Defenders are seen to have gained superhuman powers from Loki.

In other media

Television
 Nighthawk appears in The Super Hero Squad Show episode "Whom Continuity Would Destroy!", voiced by Adam West. The Grandmaster and Thanos pit Nighthawk and fellow Squadron Supreme members Power Princess and Hyperion against Iron Man, Scarlet Witch, and the Hulk respectively.
 Nighthawk appears in Avengers Assemble, voiced by Anthony Ruivivar. This version is an alien and tactical strategist who thinks of his team as nothing more than tools; even going so far as to consider himself the architect to Hyperion's hammer. He first appears in a flashback in the episode "Hyperion", in which he and the Squadron Supreme destroy their alien homeworld. In his self-titled episode, Nighthawk disguises himself as S.H.I.E.L.D. Agent Kyle Richmond. He and the Squadron Supreme would eventually be defeated by the Avengers and remanded to the Vault.

Marvel Cinematic Universe
Several characters inspired by Nighthawk appear in the Marvel Cinematic Universe (MCU) media franchise.
 "Jackson Norriss" appears in the Marvel One-Shot, All Hail the King (2014), portrayed by Scoot McNairy. This version is a member of the Ten Rings terrorist organization who goes undercover as a reporter to break Trevor Slattery out of Seagate Prison and punish him for impersonating the Mandarin during the events of the film Iron Man 3 (2013).
 The actual Jackson Norris appears in the web series WHIH Newsfront (2016), portrayed by A. J. Bowen. This version is a correspondent working for the titular news organization.

Toys 
In 2013, the Kyle Richmond incarnation of Nighthawk was released in wave 018 of Hasbro's Marvel Universe 3.75" toyline.

Collected editions

References

External links
 Nighthawk (Squadron Supreme of America version) at Marvel Wiki
 
 
 
 

Characters created by Keith Giffen
Characters created by Roy Thomas
Characters created by Sal Buscema
Comics characters introduced in 1969
Comics characters introduced in 1971
Comics characters introduced in 1998
Comics characters introduced in 2008
Fictional characters with superhuman durability or invulnerability
Marvel Comics American superheroes
Marvel Comics characters with superhuman strength
Marvel Comics male superheroes
Marvel Comics male supervillains
Marvel Comics mutates
Marvel Comics superheroes
Marvel Comics supervillains
Squadron Supreme
Vigilante characters in comics